In Greek mythology, Anaxo ( or ; Ancient Greek: Ἀναξώ) was the daughter of Alcaeus (son of Perseus and Andromeda) and Astydameia (daughter of Pelops and Hippodamia). Her mother was also named as Laonome, daughter of Guneus, otherwise she was Hipponome, daughter of Menoeceus. Anaxo was the sister of Amphitryon and Perimede, wife of Licymnius. She married Electryon, king of Mycenae, and her father's brother, being the son of Perseus and Andromeda. Her children were Alcmena, Stratobates, Gorgophonus, Phylonomus, Celaeneus, Amphimachus, Lysinomus, Cheirimachus, Anactor, and Archelaus.

Note

References 

 Patricia Turner, Charles Russell Coulter, "Dictionary of ancient deities", Oxford University Press, 2001, 
Pseudo-Apollodorus, The Library with an English Translation by Sir James George Frazer, F.B.A., F.R.S. in 2 Volumes, Cambridge, MA, Harvard University Press; London, William Heinemann Ltd. 1921. Online version at the Perseus Digital Library. Greek text available from the same website.
Princesses in Greek mythology
Queens in Greek mythology